Oakley  may refer to:

Places

Antarctica
Oakley Glacier

United Kingdom
Oakley, Bedfordshire, England
Oakley, Buckinghamshire, England
Oakley, Dorset, England
Oakley, Fife, Scotland
Oakley, Gloucestershire, England
Oakley, Hampshire, England
Oakley, Northamptonshire, a former civil parish in Kettering
Oakley, Oxfordshire, England
Oakley, Staffordshire, England
Oakley, Suffolk, England
Great Oakley, Essex, England
Great Oakley, Northamptonshire, England
Little Oakley, Essex, England
Little Oakley, Northamptonshire, England
Oakley Green, Berkshire, England
Oakley Park, Bromley Common, Kent, England

United States
Oakley (Gallatin, Tennessee), listed on the National Register of Historic Places (NRHP)
Oakley (Heathsville, Virginia), NRHP-listed in Northumberland County
Oakley (Spotsylvania County, Virginia), NRHP-listed
Oakley (Upperville, Virginia), NRHP-listed in Fauquier County
Oakley, Buncombe County, North Carolina, located inside Asheville
Oakley, California
Oakley, Cincinnati, Ohio
Oakley, Delaware
Oakley, Indiana
Oakley, Idaho
Oakley, Kansas
Oakley, Maryland
Oakley, Michigan
Oakley, Pitt County, North Carolina
Oakley, Utah
Oakley, Wisconsin
Oakley, Wyoming, a city in Lincoln County

People 
Oakley (given name)
Oakley (surname)

Brands and enterprises
 Oakley, Inc., an eyewear manufacturer
Oakley Hospital, earlier known as Whau Lunatic Asylum, in Auckland, New Zealand
Oakley's, several enterprises owned by Charles Oakley

Other uses
 Baron Oakley, a hereditary title
Oakley class lifeboat a lifeboat operated by the Royal National Lifeboat Institution between 1958 and 1993
Oakley protocol, a key management protocol (computing term)
Oakley United F.C. (Scotland), a Scottish football club
, a number of steamships of this name

See also
Oakeley (disambiguation)
Oakleigh (disambiguation)
Oakley House (disambiguation)